Unicorn Digital is an independent Canadian record label founded in 1996 by Michel St-Père. The label was originally created to promote his band Mystery, however since its founding the label has expanded to include many more artists. In 2005, the label changed its name from Unicorn Records to Unicorn Digital.

Artists

See also
List of record labels

References

Canadian independent record labels
Record labels established in 1996
Progressive rock record labels
1996 establishments in Quebec